An enharmonic keyboard is a musical keyboard, where enharmonically equivalent notes do not have identical pitches. A conventional keyboard has, for instance, only one key and pitch for C and D, but an enharmonic keyboard would have two different keys and pitches for these notes. Traditionally, such keyboards use black split keys to express both notes, but diatonic white keys may also be split.

As an important device to compose, play and study enharmonic music, enharmonic keyboards are capable of producing microtones and have separate keys for at least some pairs of not equal pitches that must be enharmonically equal in conventional keyboard instruments.

The term (divergence of scholar opinions) 
"Enharmonic keyboard" is a term used by scholars in their studies of enharmonic keyboard instruments (organ, harpsichord, piano, harmonium and synthesizer) with reference to a keyboard with more than 12 keys per octave. Scholarly consensus about the term's precise definition currently has not been established.

In the New Grove Dictionary (2001) Nicolas Meeùs defines an "enharmonic keyboard" as "a keyboard with more than 12 keys and sounding more than 12 different pitches in the octave". He however does not specify the origin of the term in his article. Rudolph Rasch (2002) suggested applying the term "enharmonic keyboard" more precisely, to keyboards with 29–31 keys per octave.

Patrizio Barbieri (2007), in his turn, raised the objection that this usage is not supported by early theoretical works. As for historical evidence, confusion has often reigned over the terminology of split-keyed instruments, which were sometimes called ‘chromatic', sometimes 'enharmonic'. The builders (or persons who only described the construction) of such keyboard instruments often gave them names without any reference to genus, like 'archicembalo' (Nicola Vicentino), 'cembalo pentarmonico' (Giovanni Battista Doni), 'clavicymbalum universale' (Michael Praetorius) or even simply 'clauocembalo' (that is clavicembalo; Gioseffo Zarlino).

Some modern scholars (Christopher Stembridge, Denzil Wraight) describe instruments with such keyboards as "split-keyed instruments".

Known realizations 

One of the first instruments with an enharmonic keyboard was the archicembalo built by Nicola Vicentino, an Italian Renaissance composer and music theorist. The archicembalo had 36 keys per octave and was very well suited for meantone temperament. Vicentino also had made one arciorgano in Rome and one arciorgano in Milan. Both pipe organs were equipped with enharmonic keyboards, like those of the archicembalo. None of Vicentino's instruments survive.

Many instruments with enharmonic keyboards were built during the Renaissance and Baroque eras. Most composers and performers who used these instruments are virtually unknown today. Among them are Johann Kaspar Kerll's teacher, Giovanni Valentini, who played a harpsichord with 77 keys for 4 octaves (19 keys per octave plus one extra C), and Friedrich Suppig, published one of the definitive works for an instrument with an enharmonic keyboard: the Fantasia of the Labyrinthus Musicus, which is a multi-sectional composition that makes use of all 24 keys and is intended for a keyboard with 31 notes per octave and pure major thirds.

With the advent of microtonal music in the 20th century, instruments with enharmonic keyboards became more fashionable, as did early and Baroque music for such instruments. For performance and recording purposes, either old instruments are reconstructed or two recordings of two differently tuned instruments are combined in one, thus creating an effect of an enharmonic keyboard.

Isomorphic note-layouts are a class of enharmonic keyboard, opened in 1721 by Ivo Salzinger's Tastatura nova perfecta, Germany. One isomorphic note-layout, the Wicki, when mapped to a hexagonal array of buttons, is particularly well-suited to the control of enharmonic scales. The orientation of its hexagonal columns of octaves and tempered perfect fifths place all the notes of every well-formed scale – pentatonic (cardinality 5), diatonic (cardinality 7), chromatic (cardinality 12), and enharmonic (cardinality 19) – in a tight, contiguous cluster.

The notes of each progressively-higher cardinality are appended to the outer edges of the lower-cardinality scale, such that each well-formed scale's note-controlling buttons are embedded, unchanged, within the set of those controlling the higher-cardinality scales. Hence, the skills gained in learning to play chromatic music on a chromatic Wicki keyboard can be applied, without modification, to performance on an enharmonic Wicki keyboard.

Isomorphic keyboards were not discovered until the latter half of the 19th century.

See also 
 Equal temperament
 Fokker organ
 Meantone temperament
 Musical tuning
 Jankó keyboard

Notes

References

Further reading
 
 
 

Musical keyboard layouts
Musical tuning